Berlepsch's canastero (Asthenes berlepschi) is a species of the ovenbird family, Furnariidae. It is endemic to Bolivia.

Its natural habitats are subtropical or tropical high-altitude shrubland and rural gardens. It is threatened by habitat loss.

The bird's common name and Latin binomial commemorate the German ornithologist and collector Hans von Berlepsch.

References

Berlepsch's canastero
Birds of the Bolivian Andes
Endemic birds of Bolivia
Berlepsch's canastero
Taxonomy articles created by Polbot